El Circulo Cubano de Tampa (also known as the Cuban Club) is a historic building constructed in 1917 (to replace an earlier structure on the same site that burned down) to serve as a gathering place for Cuban immigrants in Ybor City, Tampa, Florida. It was designed by Tampa architect M. Leo Elliott. It is located at Palm Avenue and 14th Street. On November 15, 1972, it was added to the U.S. National Register of Historic Places. On April 18, 2012, the AIA's Florida Chapter placed the building on its list of Florida Architecture: 100 Years. 100 Places as Cuban Club, Ybor City.

The building has a theater and once included a bowling alley, spa, pharmacy, ballroom, library, and cantina.  Decorated with imported tile, stained glass, scraffito spandrels and murals it continues the legacy of the club first established in 1902 as a mutual aid society.

In 1893, Cuban revolutionary, writer, and poet Jose Marti was visiting the building in order to gain support for his revolutionary party and movement in Cuba. During the time Marti was in the building, there was an assassination attempt on his life when two Spanish agents gave him a glass of poison.  Marti survived the encounter by pure intuition and quickly forgave his would-be assassins.  Today there is a plaque remembering the incident outside the western entrance to the structure.

See also 
The Mutual Aid Societies of Ybor City
El Centro Español de Tampa
Centro Asturiano de Tampa
Ybor City Historic District

References

External links
Official website
National Register of Historic Places
Florida's Office of Cultural and Historical Programs page on the Circulo 
Cuban Club Records at the University of South Florida

Buildings and structures in Tampa, Florida
Cuban-American history
Cuban-American culture in Tampa, Florida
National Register of Historic Places in Tampa, Florida
Ethnic fraternal orders in the United States
1917 establishments in Florida